is a 2008 fighting game published by Capcom, who also co-developed the game with Dimps. It was the first original main entry in the series since Street Fighter III in 1997, a hiatus of eleven years.

The coin-operated arcade game version was released in Japan on July 18, 2008, with North American arcades importing the machines by August. The console versions for the PlayStation 3 and Xbox 360 were released in Japan on February 12, 2009, and were sold in North American stores as early as February 16, with a February 18 intended release date. 

The official European release was on February 20. A Microsoft Windows version was released on July 2, 2009, in Japan, July 3, 2009 in Europe and July 7, 2009, in the United States. A version for iOS was released on March 10, 2010. Also, an Android version was launched, initially as an exclusive for certain LG devices. Then by December 31, 2012, the exclusivity expired and the game was made available for all Android devices on the Play Store, with a region restriction that makes it available only in Japan. An updated version, Super Street Fighter IV, was released as a standalone title in April 2010.

Street Fighter IV received universal critical acclaim; receiving universally high scores from many gaming websites and magazines and it has often been cited as one of the greatest games of all time. It was followed by Super Street Fighter IV and Arcade Edition in 2010, 3D Edition in 2011, and Ultra Street Fighter IV in 2014. All versions of Street Fighter IV have sold over 9million units across all platforms.

Gameplay

Producer Yoshinori Ono stated that he wanted to keep the game closer to Street Fighter II. The battles in SFIV begin with a short pre-fight intro, a small cinematic dialogue sequence which varies depending on the player's chosen character. A new system called Focus Attacks (Saving Attack for the Japanese version) has been introduced, as well as Ultra Moves. The traditional six-button control scheme returns, with new features and Special Moves integrated into the input system, mixing classic gameplay with additional innovations.

The game arguably has a similar feel to Super Street Fighter II Turbo, but also includes a few features from Street Fighter III: 3rd Strike. As in Street Fighter III, throwing is performed by pressing both light attack buttons, while pressing both heavy attack buttons performs the character's personal action or taunt. Pressing both medium attack buttons performs a character's Focus Attack. Dashes and quick standing are also in the game. C. Viper and Dan (with the air taunt) are the only characters who can perform a high jump.

It was intended that bonus rounds such as the car-smashing stage from earlier Street Fighter games would return. Ono later stated that the bonus stages would not be in the arcade game, citing the reason to be that the time players spend on bonus stages is time during which they have no chance of losing, which ultimately takes money from arcade operators. The bonus stages were later added in Super Street Fighter IV. There are also Rival Battles which have a cutscene between two characters (which depends on who they are) before the battle starts.

Focus Attacks, known as Saving Attack in the Japanese version, is a new system introduced in Street Fighter IV. The Focus Attack is a move that allows the player to absorb an attack and launch a counterattack, and it is performed by holding the medium punch and medium kick buttons simultaneously. There are two phases to the attack. In the first phase, the player will shift into a new stance, at which point they are able to absorb a single hit from the opponent. The second phase is the counterattack. The longer the player holds down the medium punch and kick buttons, the more powerful the attack will be. There are three stages to the charge.

 If the Focus Attack is held for a brief moment, no unique effects occur when attacking.
 If held for slightly longer, the character charging the Focus Attack will flash white, indicating that it will crumple the opponent (if they are on the ground) and leave them crumpled briefly.
 When fully charged, the attack will also ignore blocking.

Attacks that were absorbed during the first phase of a Focus Attack still cause damage to the player; however, life lost from the opponent's attack will be quickly regenerated afterward. In addition, during the first and second phase of the Focus Attack, the player may perform a dash either forward or backward to cancel the Focus Attack. Finally, at the cost of two bars of the Super Combo gauge, many Special Moves can be canceled into a Focus Attack. By executing a Focus Attack during the Special Move, the animation of the move will be cut short and go instantly into the Focus Attack animation. This allows players with precise timing to cancel Special Moves into Focus Attacks, and in turn cancel Focus Attacks into the forward dash, resulting in new combo possibilities. If a Special Move is blocked by the opponent, the new system allows players to cancel the blocked move with a Focus Attack, and then cancel the Focus Attack by dashing backward safely away from the opponent. Ono has stated that this system was incorporated in order to shift the emphasis away from combos and toward a more realistic system he has compared to boxing, in which "the skill is in reading your opponent's move before [they start] moving ... We haven't forgotten about combos and linked moves, but focus makes it so that you have to read your opponent." The system aims to make ground attacks as viable a way of approaching opponents as jumping was in previous games. The focus system is a core part of Street Fighter IV's gameplay.

In addition to the powered-up versions of Special Moves introduced in previous Street Fighter games such as Super Combos and EX Special Moves, the game also introduces a new type of powered-up Special Move officially dubbed the Ultra Combo. Ultra Combos are long and cinematic moves featuring a lengthy combination of punches, kicks and other fighting techniques. Just as there is a Super Combo gauge, there is also an Ultra Combo gauge (officially known as the Revenge Gauge or Revenge Meter), but whereas the Super Combo gauge fills up when the player hits their opponent or performs a Special Move, the Revenge Gauge fills when one takes damage from their opponent (similar to the K Groove featured in Capcom vs. SNK 2). Along with the Super Combos, Ultra Combos are one of the only times (besides Zangief, E. Honda, Seth and Abel's command throws) the camera breaks from its normal fixed position to show a more dynamic, cinematic view of the gameplay.

Plot
Street Fighter IV takes place after the events of Street Fighter II and before the events of Street Fighter V (thus is chronologically set before Street Fighter III which takes place in the future).

After M. Bison's survival following his encounter with Akuma, the S.I.N. corporation began another fighting tournament in order to draw out the most powerful street fighters on Earth to complete the BLECE project. Each World Warrior has their own reasons for entering this tournament, but S.I.N.'s real desire is to lure Ryu to them in order to analyze the Satsui no Hadō, believed to be the last piece of data needed to complete BLECE.

Gouken, having recently awakened from a coma after surviving an attack by Akuma which occurred between the events of Street Fighter and Street Fighter Alpha about seven years before, knowing of SIN's interest in Ryu, starts looking for him to instruct to stop his Satsui no Hado development. He instructs Ryu and shows him a power known as the Mu no Ken (or Power of Nothingness), which is essentially the opposite of Satsui no Hadō, where calm and tranquility transcend human powers.

Akuma, knowing what Gouken has done to Ryu, has become driven with fury and has a fight to the death with Gouken once again, releasing everything from his Satsui no Hadō against all the power of Gouken's Mu no Ken.

It is revealed that Crimson Viper was a double agent, and she betrayed Seth, in addition to Juri who also wanted to see Shadaloo's total downfall, and set up the fight between M. Bison and Seth. Although Seth took over SIN, M. Bison managed to take on the consciousness of another clone thanks to the scientists at Shadaloo, and ends up with Seth.

M. Bison is behind the SIN, letting the plans go, while everyone thinks he is dead, and the Seth that the players find at the end of the game is revealed to be a clone, as the real Seth was killed by M. Bison.

Abel, who is a fighter with no memory, supposedly was saved by Charlie Nash and joins Chun-Li and Guile to destroy the SIN headquarters, so they manage to end this organization.

Characters

Chronologically set between the Street Fighter II series and the Street Fighter III series, the playable character roster of the arcade version includes the cast of the original Street Fighter II (all 12 characters, including the four Shadaloo Grand Masters) and four new characters. Akuma from Super Street Fighter II Turbo also appears as a hidden playable character, as well as a secret opponent, for a total of 17 playable characters. Additionally, the game includes two more secret characters: Seth as the game's standard final boss, and Gouken as a secret opponent, which makes for a total of 19 characters. The console version includes 6 more characters to the roster making for a total of 25, the returning characters are: Cammy, Dan, Fei Long, Gen, Rose and Sakura.

Newcomers:
  Abel, a French fighter who utilizes full-contact karate, Judo and Russian combat sambo to defeat opponents (note his kurtka). He is described as an amnesiac, a "man with no past" looking to defeat surviving members of Shadaloo. He is later revealed to be a prototype of Seth's model.
  Crimson Viper, a female American spy wearing sunglasses, leather gloves and a form-fitting suit with weapons she entered the tournament in order to "test" her skills.
  Rufus, an obese kung fu fighter, who seeks to fight Ken to prove himself as the best fighter in the United States.
  El Fuerte (Spanish for "The Strong One"), a Mexican luchador and aspiring gourmet chef.
  Seth, also known as "The Puppet Master", is the new boss character. He is the CEO of S.I.N., the weapons division of Shadaloo. His body has been modified using advanced technology. His Special Moves are techniques used by other characters.
  Gouken, the elder brother of Akuma, and Ryu and Ken's master, appears in the arcade version as a secret computer-controlled challenger in the end of the single-player mode, making his debut as a fighter in the Street Fighter series.

Development
Before producer Yoshinori Ono pitched the idea to Capcom R&D head Keiji Inafune, the prevailing attitude around Capcom was that a new numeric entry to the Street Fighter series would not be made. Initially, there was much resistance to Ono's pitch for a new Street Fighter game so many years after the original. The gap from 2000 to 2008, since Street Fighter EX3, the latest Street Fighter game at that point, represented the longest time the series had gone without a sequel. However, in light of fan demand plus the positive reception to Street Fighter II' Hyper Fighting on Xbox Live Arcade, Inafune eventually allowed the project to begin. This was Ono's first take on a new entry for the Street Fighter series as a producer, although he had previously worked on Street Fighter III 3rd Strike as a "sound management director" and previously produced Capcom Fighting Jam. The experience provided by Super Street Fighter II Turbo became the main influence for the Street Fighter IV development team.

The original game concept, titled Street Fighter IV Flashback, imagined in part by David Sirlin, the designer of Super Street Fighter II Turbo HD Remix, never made it past the proposal stage. Flashback would likewise feature the 2.5D gameplay and a roster made of classic Street Fighter II characters plus Sakura and a few new characters. The game would have also featured a single-player mode with third-person 3D action (similar to this of the God of War series) that focused on Ryu's backstory, as well as all Street Fighter arcade games in their original forms and a 3D version of Super Turbo. Flashback'''s proposed easy control system was later used in Tatsunoko vs. Capcom: Ultimate All-Stars, minus its titular "flashback" gameplay feature.

While Street Fighter IV features models and backgrounds rendered in 3D, the gameplay remains on a traditional 2D plane, with the camera having freedom to move in 3D at certain times during fights, for dramatic effect, similar to the Street Fighter EX series Capcom produced with Arika. Initially the title had been developed to use 3D hitboxes, but the testers felt it did not have the "pixel perfect" precision of a Street Fighter game, and the game was therefore changed to use 2D hitboxes. 
Ono has also cited the arcade version of Arc System Works' Battle Fantasia as the inspiration for the game's three-dimensional art style. Art director and character designer Daigo Ikeno, who previously worked on Street Fighter III 3rd Strike, opted for non-photorealistic rendering to give them a hand-drawn look, with visual effects accented in calligraphic strokes, ink smudges and ink sprays during the fights.Street Fighter IVs musical score was primarily composed by Hideyuki Fukasawa. The game's music consisted of new and old material created for it. Several music pieces (such as the themes for the returning SFII characters) were rearranged for SFIV. While previous Street Fighter games contained limited voice work, Street Fighter IV was the first Street Fighter series game to feature extensive voice acting. The game offers a choice between the original Japanese or an English dub.

The game runs on the Taito Type X2 arcade board inside a Taito Vewlix cabinet. It takes advantage of the Type X2's network capabilities and allows players in separate machines within the same LAN to fight each other.

Home versionsStreet Fighter IV was also released for PlayStation 3, Xbox 360 and Microsoft Windows, featuring additional playable characters and features not found in the arcade game. Capcom later released an iOS version on March 10, 2010. In March 2017 the Xbox 360 version of Street Fighter IV became compatible with the Xbox One.

Additional characters
The notable addition in the home versions of Street Fighter IV are eight unlockable and playable characters not available in the arcade version. Seth and Gouken, computer-played characters in the arcade, and six characters from other Street Fighter games were added, to a total of 25 characters, all of them playable. The introduced characters are Dan, Fei Long, Sakura, Cammy, Gen, and Rose.

Additional features
Home versions also feature online play, six new stages, downloadable content, a Challenge Mode that acts as a training module for new and experienced players, requiring them to reproduce indicated moves or combos with successive levels of increasing complexity, as well as selectable English or Japanese voices for the characters (similar to the voice option settings in the Soulcalibur games), making Street Fighter IV the first game in the series since the original Street Fighter to feature English voice acting for all the characters. The game also offers a new opening cinematic scene featuring the  theme song "The Next Door", by Exile, in both Japanese and English (as "The Next Door -Indestructible-" which featured Flo Rida in the extended version of that version) (depending on language settings), and animated opening and ending sequences for each character's story in Arcade mode.

The iOS version allows for bluetooth-based multiplayer between devices, but features only eight of the console version's characters and stages. The characters consist of Ryu, Ken, Chun-Li, Guile, Dhalsim, Blanka, Abel and M. Bison. In an update two more characters were added: Zangief and Cammy. The most recent update features Sagat and an unlockable character, Dee Jay.

Windows version additions
The Windows version of Street Fighter IV includes all the features found in the PlayStation 3 and Xbox 360 and some extras, that Capcom representatives say could make it "the definitive version" of the game. The game features online play via Games for Windows – Live, with built-in voice chat and PC-exclusive achievements, but no cross-platform playability would be available with Xbox 360 players. Also, the game features higher resolutions, and three new freely selectable visual styles, named "Ink", "Watercolor" and "Posterize". There are also two bundles of the game: regular (game only, $39.99) and a bundle that includes the Mad Catz FightPad (with the Ryu design) that is currently sold separately for the Xbox 360 version. Those who pre-ordered the game at Best Buy received a DVD with an Eagle One animated comic (this is not the same as The Ties That Bind that comes in the collector's editions of the console versions). Additionally, Svensson has stated on the Capcom Unity forums that the retail version uses disc-based SecuROM as its main form of copy protection for the North American release. The specifications for the game were released on May 15, 2009, and are considered relatively modest.

Marketing
For Western markets, three different packages for the game were prepared—the European release, the North American standard package, and the North American Collector's Edition. The contents of the Collector's Edition are nearly identical to those featured in the European version, and are the following:
 A comic book style mini strategy guide by Prima (which also published a full strategy guide for the game in the U.S.), featuring artwork by UDON.
 A disc including the 65-minute animated film titled , produced by Studio 4°C as a prologue for the game, and a selection of the game's trailers (a Blu-ray disc for the PS3 version and game disc with the movie in 720p for the Xbox 360).
 A soundtrack CD (not in Europe).
 Crimson Viper and Ryu figurines (in the US release, PS3 owners will get a Ryu figurine, while Xbox 360 owners get a Crimson Viper figure. In Europe, PS3 and Xbox 360 owners got both figurines in place of a soundtrack CD.)
 Five downloadable character costumes, which is known as the Brawler Pack that includes alternate costumes for: Zangief, E. Honda, Rufus, El Fuerte, and Abel.

Mad Catz produced six controllers for the game, two Arcade sticks and a game pad each for the PlayStation 3 and Xbox 360. These products include a basic model joystick, the "Street Fighter IV FightStick"; a heavier and sturdier stick, the "Street Fighter IV FightStick Tournament Edition'; and a six-button game pad, the "Street Fighter IV FightPad". Meanwhile, peripheral manufacturer Hori also produced two joysticks for the game for the Japanese/Asian markets based on previous joystick models produced by the company.

iOS version
An iOS version of the game was released on March 10, 2010. This, and subsequent mobile versions retains many of the console version's features, but contains a simplified combo system and replaces the original game's 3D polygonal fighter models with 2D pre-rendered sprites. In addition the game also includes Bluetooth multiplayer and Game Center achievements, and was released with eight playable characters, though more have been added through free updates. This version is no longer available to download on the iOS store.

Later a version called Street Fighter IV Volt was released for the iPhone and iPod Touch on June 30, 2011, which enables online play. Another version called Street Fighter IV: Champion Edition was released on July 12, 2017, which features updated graphics and adds Poison, Ibuki and Dudley to the roster, increasing the total number of playable fighters to 25. An additional six fighters (Gouken, Rose, Elena, Juri, Guy, and Evil Ryu) were later added into the roster through free updates.

Android version
On January 5, 2012, a version of the game called Street Fighter IV HD was released for LG's Android-powered Nitro HD and Optimus LTE phones. On December 30, 2012, the exclusivity was dropped and the game was re-released on Google Play, this time titled Street Fighter IV, with a region restriction in place that makes it available only in Japan. On February 21, 2018, an Android port of Street Fighter IV: Champion Edition was made available worldwide on Google Play. This version contains 32 playable characters, including Dan as a platform exclusive. This version of the game has had 1 million installs.

Downloadable content
The console versions of Street Fighter IV support downloadable content (DLC), made available for download via Microsoft's Xbox Live Marketplace and Sony's PlayStation Network.

The first expansion pack, titled "Championship Mode", was released free of charge on April 24, 2009. It provides players with a replay mode, a new points system and an enhanced tournament matching system. Championship mode is a game mode where a series of players compete against each other for ranking points. The higher the ranking, the harder the contest the player will participate in. The PlayStation 3 version of the download allows the player to vote on the parts of the recorded match they thought were "funny", "awesome", and "beautiful". The Xbox 360 version allows the player to download their recorded fights to the console.

In addition, five alternate costume packs are available for purchase. These costume packs include the alternate costumes already seen in the arcade version, and were released on separate dates following the game's launch. A single package called the "Complete Alternate Costume Pack", containing alternate costumes for all 25 characters was made available for download on May 5, 2009, in North America, and May 8, 2009, in Europe.
 February 17, 2009 (North America); February 20, 2009 (Europe): Brawler Pack including alternate costumes for: Zangief, E. Honda, Rufus, El Fuerte, and Abel.
 February 24, 2009 (North America); February 27, 2009 (Europe): Femme Fatale Pack including alternate costumes for: Chun-Li, Cammy, Sakura, Rose, and C. Viper.
 March 3, 2009 (North America); March 6, 2009 (Europe): Shoryuken Pack including alternate costumes for: Ryu, Ken, Akuma, Gouken, and Dan.
 March 10, 2009 (North America); March 13, 2009 (Europe): Shadaloo Pack including alternate costumes for: Seth, M. Bison, Sagat, Balrog, and Vega.
 March 17, 2009 (North America); March 20, 2009 (Europe): Classic Pack including alternate costumes for: Guile, Dhalsim, Fei-Long, Blanka, and Gen.

Although initially Capcom stated that there were no plans to add any additional characters to the game, wanting to focus on core gameplay values, Yoshinori Ono later revealed that unfinished versions of Dee Jay and T. Hawk (the only two missing characters from SSF2T) had been made, and given sufficient fan request for them, they could eventually get added into the game. These characters eventually found their way into Super Street Fighter IV.

There was an update for the iOS version that added Zangief and Cammy to the roster. A second update added C. Viper and E. Honda whilst a third added Sagat and Dee Jay—the latter having to be unlocked. DLC is also available. So far Ryu and Chun-Li each have one new costume each. Additional music, 'Street Fighter II Arranged BGM', can also be purchased to provide alternate in-game audio.

Related media

AnimeStreet Fighter IV: The Ties That Bind is an animated movie directed by Jirō Kanai that was featured in a bonus disc included in the Collector's Edition of Street Fighter IV for the PlayStation 3 and Xbox 360. The plot, which takes place before the events of Street Fighter IV, begins with Cammy's Team Delta Red task force who are investigating an energy anomaly. At the same time, Chun-Li and Guile investigate the disappearance of well-known martial artists. Meanwhile, Crimson Viper is sent to capture Ryu on orders from Seth, who knows about Ryu's Satsui no Hadou and desires it for himself.

Additionally, four promotional anime shorts featuring characters from the game were released.

Comic
In addition to The Ties That Bind animated film included with the collectors edition of the game, UDON also published a four-issue comic mini-series based on Street Fighter IV, with the first issue being released February 18, 2009. The comic focuses on the new characters (Abel, Viper, El Fuerte, and Rufus) and their interactions with many of the series' mainstays.

PlayStation Home
In the PlayStation 3's online community-based service PlayStation Home, Capcom has released a Street Fighter IV themed game space called "S.I.N.'s Secret Base from Street Fighter IV". It has such features as Challenge Opponent which lets users do an action based on their fighting level in Street Fighter IV, as well as a shop with themed costumes and ornaments of all the characters from Street Fighter IV. This space was released in the Japanese version on July 30, 2009, in the Asian version on September 24, 2009, in the European version on October 9, 2009, and in the North American version on October 23, 2009. In addition to the game space, costumes, and ornaments, Street Fighter IV also fully supported Game Launching in PlayStation Home which let users set up multi-player games in Home, with advanced options, and launch into the game from Home. This feature was added on April 23, 2009. Some trophies in Street Fighter IV also rewarded Home rewards.

Pachislot Edition
On October 12, 2011, Enterrise released a pachislot version of the game in Japan. This version features all of the characters from the console release. The player plays as Ryu in the game's story, although other characters such as Ken or Chun-Li can only be played at certain points in the game. New to this version are 3D overworld segments where Ryu travels through some of the game's stages and destinations. The battle segments also return in this version, but unlike the arcade and console versions, the pachislot version's battle segments are now turn-based (similar to Pokémon Stadium, its sequel and Pokémon Battle Revolution). The Reg Bonus in this game features a new door-opening bonus stage that didn't make it into the arcade and console versions of Street Fighter IV and its updated versions. A sequel based on SSFIV: Arcade Edition was released on March 22, 2016.

Reception

Both the home versions of Street Fighter IV have received an aggregate rating of "universal acclaim" from Metacritic based on the reviews of critics. The game received an aggregated score of 94 out of 100 from Metacritic for its PlayStation 3 version, 93 out of 100 for its Xbox 360 version, and 91 out of 100 for its Microsoft Windows version.

The arcade version of Street Fighter IV was voted Best Game of 2008 in Japan by the editorial staff of Arcadia magazine in the February 2009 issue of the publication. The game also won in the categories of "Best Graphics", "Best Production", and the "Reader's Choice Award". The character Ryu took the No. 1 spot in the magazine's "Top 20 Characters of 2008" in the same issue. The February 2009 issue of PlayStation: The Official Magazine has rated the game 5/5, while the February 2009 issue of the Official Xbox Magazine has given Street Fighter IV a score of 9.5/10. IGN gave the game a 9.3/10, calling it an "irrevocably deep fighting game", but said that the anime cutscenes are "so poorly animated and tell you almost nothing about the story or the context for each character's participation in the tournament." GameSpot gave it the best Fighting Game of 2009 in the Editor's Choice and Reader's Choice areas. Additionally, GameTrailers named the title as the Best Fighting Game of 2009. Street Fighter IV also won "Fighting Game of the Year" at the 2009 Spike Video Game Awards.

Giant Bomb gave the game 5 out of 5 stars stating that "Street Fighter IV combines old and new in powerful ways, resulting in a game familiar enough to bring retired fans back into the fold while being different enough to appeal to the players who have stuck with the genre since day one." Eurogamer gave the game 10/10 stating that "after over a month of playing Street Fighter IV almost daily, what has become quite clear is that it manages to appeal to a huge range of abilities and tastes without ever compromising its fidelity".

The iOS version has been critically acclaimed as well. Gameplayershub.com gave the game a 97% score, indicating that the game had such polish it should lead the way for future games on the platform.Edge ranked the game #14 on its list of "The 100 Best Games To Play Today", stating "SFIV opens up the genre to all-comers without ever compromising the system's depth or fidelity." In the 2017 version of their all-time top 100, Ultra Street Fighter IV was the only fighting game on the list.

Sales
The game topped the multi-format charts and set sales records in the UK, with 53% of sales being on the PS3. By March 31, 2009, Street Fighter IV had sold over 3 million copies worldwide. The PlayStation 3 and Xbox 360 versions of Street Fighter IV sold 3.4million copies. It was also one of the most rented games of 2009.

Updated versions

Super Street Fighter IV

Released on April 27, 2010, Super Street Fighter IV is the first major update to Street Fighter IV. Super Street Fighter IV includes several new online game modes, five new stages, a new announcer and ten additional characters, as well as tweaks and changes to the existing ones, such as new Ultra Combos and additional costumes. Among the added characters are returners T. Hawk, Dee Jay, Adon, Guy, Cody, Ibuki, Makoto, and Dudley. The newly introduced characters are Juri, a Korean taekwondo fighter who works as a spy for Seth's organization, S.I.N., and Hakan, a Turkish oil wrestler. The game also featured new intros and endings for all characters from previous installment.

The game was originally released for the PlayStation 3 and Xbox 360, later getting an arcade version with extended content. The arcade version was later backported to consoles in the form of Super Street Fighter IV: Arcade Edition. A handheld version of Super Street Fighter IV, titled Super Street Fighter IV: 3D Edition, was also released for the Nintendo 3DS in March 2011, including stereoscopic 3D graphics and new features.

Super Street Fighter IV: Arcade Edition

An arcade version of Super Street Fighter IV was released by Capcom in December 2010, titled Super Street Fighter IV: Arcade Edition. Arcade Edition added Yun, Yang, Evil Ryu and Oni to the roster, as well as changes to the existing characters. The Arcade Edition was later released as both a standalone game and as a downloadable update. In late 2011, a free balance update patch called Version 2012 was released.

Ultra Street Fighter IV
A new update called Ultra Street Fighter IV (ウルトラストリートファイターIV) was announced for release in early 2014 at the 2013 Evolution Championship Series. Before the release of the game, Capcom set up test locations to gather fan feedback that was taken into account for the final product. The game was released in Japanese arcades in April 2014, later being distributed for home platforms as both a paid downloadable update for Super Street Fighter IV and Super Street Fighter IV: Arcade Edition, and as a standalone retail game. The update version for Xbox 360 and PlayStation 3 was released on June 3, 2014, with the full retail versions to follow on August 5. The PC versions (both digital and retail) were released on August 8, the PC port being delayed to get the console versions ready in time for the 2014 Evolution Championship Series. The PC version of Ultra Street Fighter IV was the first game in the series to use Steam from day one, following the discontinuation of Games for Windows – Live.

The update introduces six new stages, a different announcer and five new characters: Rolento, Elena, Hugo and Poison (all four of whom had been featured in Street Fighter X Tekken), in addition to Decapre, a member of M. Bison's Dolls, who makes her first playable appearance in the series. It has been revealed that, despite some of the new characters having been recently featured in X Tekken, their gameplay mechanics are substantially different in order to match the game's pace. This brings the total number of fighters to 44. The game also adds a feature called "Edition Select" which, similarly to Hyper Street Fighter II, allows players to select different versions of characters, based on their properties in past Street Fighter IV iterations. The update also adds a "Ultra Combo W" option, which makes both of the character's Ultra Combos available simultaneously, at the cost of them doing reduced damage.

Alongside the usual balance changes, the update introduces some new fighting mechanics. The first is a new move called Red Focus, similar to the regular Focus move, but having more invincibility hits. Also new is a "delayed wakeup" technique, which allows a knocked-down player to slightly lengthen the time before the character gets back up. Finally, based on fan feedback, the update removes most unblockable setups.

On September 21, 2014, it was announced that Ultra Street Fighter IV was getting a free DLC pack due for release in October, which, among other things, adds a new Omega variation to the characters, which gives them new moves and properties. For the PC version of the game, improvements were also expected in the online play experience. This download was finally released on December 15, 2014.

On December 6, 2014, it was announced at the PlayStation Experience that Ultra Street Fighter IV would be ported to PlayStation 4 by Other Ocean Interactive; the game was released on May 26, 2015. The port became noted for containing a large number of bugs and glitches; while the PS4 port was originally scheduled to be used at EVO 2015, it was later announced that the tournament would revert to using the Xbox 360 version. On July 18, 2015, the Steam port of the game was free to play (until the next day) in celebration of EVO 2015. Around the time of EVO 2015, Capcom's Peter "Combofiend" Rosas mentioned in a blog that Capcom and Sony have come to a statement that the PS4 port is now the definitive version. He stated that all major issues with the port have been resolved as well as the input lag being on par with the Xbox 360 port. Regarding Capcom Pro Tour events, all Western Capcom Pro Tour events would be migrating over to the PS4 port starting with VSFighting 5. He mentioned that Asian events will continue to use the PS3 port until the PS4 version's release.

In May 2018, Ultra Street Fighter IV was included as a pre-order digital bonus with Street Fighter 30th Anniversary Collection'', giving a total of 13 games in the original timeline of the series.

Notes

References

Further reading

External links

 Official website via Internet Archive
 Street Fighter IV at US.PlayStation.com
  (Pachislot version)
 

2008 video games
Arcade video games
Dimps games
Dinosaurs in video games
Fighting games used at the Evolution Championship Series tournament
Fighting games used at the Super Battle Opera tournament
Games for Windows certified games
Head-to-head arcade video games
Interquel video games
IOS games
PlayStation 3 games
PlayStation 4 games
Street Fighter games
Martial arts video games
Multiplayer and single-player video games
NESiCAxLive games
Video game sequels
Video games developed in Japan
Video games scored by Hideyuki Fukasawa
Video games set in Africa
Video games set in Brazil
Video games set in China
Video games set in Hawaii
Video games set in India
Video games set in Italy
Video games set in Japan
Video games set in Russia
Video games set in Scotland
Video games set in South Korea
Video games set in the United States
Video games set in Vietnam
Video games set in 1999
Video games with alternate endings
Video games with alternative versions
Video games with cel-shaded animation
Video games with AI-versus-AI modes
Windows games
Xbox 360 games
2.5D fighting games
D.I.C.E. Award for Fighting Game of the Year winners
Other Ocean Interactive games